The 2011 Estonian Figure Skating Championships took place between 17 and 19 December 2010 in Narva. Skaters competed in the disciplines of men's singles, ladies' singles, and ice dancing on the senior and junior levels. The results were used to choose the teams to the 2011 World Championships and the 2011 European Championships.

Senior results

Men

Ladies

Ice dancing

Junior results
The 2011 Estonian Junior Figure Skating Championships were held on 4–6 February 2011 in Tallinn.

Men

Ladies

Ice dancing

References

2011
Figure Skating Championships,2011
2011 in figure skating
2010 in figure skating